A list of films produced in the Tamil film industry in India in 1944:

References 

Films, Tamil
Lists of 1944 films by country or language
1944
1940s Tamil-language films